Cairnbrook is a census-designated place and coal town in Shade Township, Somerset County, Pennsylvania, United States.  The community is located along Pennsylvania Route 160 within a mile of the borough of Central City.  As of the 2010 census, the population was 520 residents.

Demographics

See also
Cairnbrook Historic District

References

Census-designated places in Somerset County, Pennsylvania
Census-designated places in Pennsylvania
Coal towns in Pennsylvania
T
Company towns in Pennsylvania
 Coal